Bantry Blues is a Gaelic football club based in Bantry, County Cork, Republic of Ireland. The club is affiliated with Cork GAA and to the Carbery division. The club has always been primarily a Gaelic football club, but has fielded hurling teams also. In 2010, the hurling section was reformed.

History
The club was founded in 1887.

Honours
 Cork Senior Football Championship Winners (2) 1995, 1998 Runners Up: 1909,1981, 2001
 Cork Premier Intermediate Football Championship Runners-Up 2022
 Cork Intermediate Football Championship Winners (6) 1912, 1934, 1936, 1938, 1975, 1993, Runners Up: 1933, 1937
 Cork Junior Football Championship Winners: (2) 1928, 1972,
 Cork Under-21 Football Championship Winners (2) 1993, 1994
 Cork Minor Football Championship Runners-Up: 1941, 1979, 2009
 Cork Junior B Hurling Championship Runners-Up 2015
 West Cork Junior A Football Championship Winners: (9) 1928, 1932, 1944, 1946, 1947, 1968, 1969, 1972, 1985  Runners-Up 1931, 1937, 1947, 1961, 1967, 1971
 West Cork Junior B Football Championship: Winners (1) 1974, Runners-Up: 1972, 1973
 West Cork Junior B Hurling Championship: Winners (4) 1972, 2012, 2015, 2019 Runners Up: 1961, 2011, 2021
 West Cork Junior C Football Championship: Winners (2) 1988, 2010 Runners-Up: 1980
 West Cork Junior D Football Championship: Winners (2) 2008, 2013
 West Cork Minor A Football Championship: Winners (16): 1941, 1957, 1959, 1961, 1968, 1969, 1970, 1971, 1975, 1977, 1979, 1980, 1989, 1990, 1991, 2007 Runners-Up 2008,2017
 West Cork Under-21 Football Championship: Winners (9) 1972, 1978, 1979, 1989, 1992, 1993, 1994, 1997, 2012  Runners-Up: 1969, 1980, 1983, 1988, 1990

Notable players
 Declan Barron
 Donal Hunt
 Mark O'Connor
 Philip Clifford
 Graham Canty
 Ruairi Deane

References

External links
Official Bantry Blues website
Archived Bantry Blues website

Bantry
Gaelic football clubs in County Cork
Gaelic games clubs in County Cork
Hurling clubs in County Cork